Thale Musestieg station is a railway station in Thale, located in the Harz district in Saxony-Anhalt, Germany.

References

Railway stations in Saxony-Anhalt
Buildings and structures in Harz (district)
Railway stations in Germany opened in 2001